Aspergillus astellatus is a species of the genus of Aspergillus. It is from the Nidulantes section. Aspergillus astellatus produces Aflatoxin B1, Aflatoxin B2 and sterigmatocystin.

Growth and morphology

A. astellatus has been cultivated on both Czapek yeast extract agar (CYA) plates and Malt Extract Agar Oxoid® (MEAOX) plates. The growth morphology of the colonies can be seen in the pictures below.

References

Further reading 
 

astellatus
Fungi described in 2014